The Bauer BAD-12 Gyrotrainer is a Czech autogyro, designed and produced by Bauer Avion of Prague.  The aircraft is supplied as a complete ready-to-fly-aircraft.

Design and development
The BAD-12 Gyrotrainer features a single main rotor, a two seats in tandem open cockpit with a windshield, tricycle landing gear with wheel pants, a triple tail and a four-cylinder, air and liquid-cooled, four-stroke, dual-ignition  Rotax 912ULS engine in pusher configuration. The turbocharged  Rotax 914 and Subaru EJ22 are optional engines.

The aircraft fuselage is made from tubing, while the cockpit fairing is composite. The main rotor has a diameter of Its . The tricycle landing gear is supplemented with a small tailwheel to prevent dragging the tail on take-off. The tailboom has a bend in it to permit the installation of larger and more efficient propellers.

Variants
BAD-12 Gyrotrainer
Base open cockpit model.
BAD-12 Gyrotrainer C 
Cabine model with a fully enclosed fairing.

Specifications (BAD-12 Gyrotrainer)

References

External links

2000s Czech sport aircraft
Single-engined pusher autogyros